This was the first edition of the tournament.

Ivan Liutarevich and Vladyslav Manafov won the title after defeating Arjun Kadhe and Daniel Masur 6–0, 6–2 in the final.

Seeds

Draw

References

External links
 Main draw

Vitas Gerulaitis Cup - Doubles